Cetrelia cetrarioides is a species of fungus belonging to the family Parmeliaceae.

It is native to Eurasia and Northern America.

References

Parmeliaceae